Bontoc (Bontok)  (also called Finallig) is the native language of the indigenous Bontoc people of the Mountain Province, in the northern part of the Philippines.

Dialects
Ethnologue reports the following locations for each of the five Bontok languages. Speaker populations from the 2007 census, as quoted in Ethnologue.

Central Bontok: spoken in Bontoc municipality, Mountain Province (in Bontoc ili, Caluttit, Dalican, Guina-ang, Ma-init, Maligcong, Samoki, and Tocucan villages). 19,600 speakers. Dialects are Khinina-ang, Finontok, Sinamoki, Jinallik, Minaligkhong and Tinokukan. 
Eastern Bontok: spoken in Barlig municipality, eastern Mountain Province (in Barlig, Kadaklan, and Lias villages). 6,170 speakers. Dialects are Finallig, Kinajakran (Kenachakran) and Liniyas. 
North Bontok: spoken in Sadanga municipality, northern Mountain Province (in Anabel, Bekigan, Belwang, Betwagan, Demang, Sacasacan, Saclit, and the municipal center of Sadanga Poblacion). There are also some speakers in southern Kalinga Province. 9,700 speakers.

Southern Bontok: spoken to the south of Bontoc municipality in Talubin, Bayyo, and Can-eo towns. 2,760 speakers. Dialects are Tinoveng and Kanan-ew. 
Southwestern Bontok: spoken in Bontoc municipality, Mountain Province (in Alab, Balili, Gonogon, and villages in the Chico River valley, southwest of the municipal capital Bontoc, along Halsema Highway). 2,470 speakers. Dialects are Ina-ab, Binalili and Ginonogon.

Phonology

These /r/ sounds are even applied to loanwords from Ilokano and Tagalog, and Spanish loanwords from the 2 languages.
Both of these allophones occur as the first member of a geminate cluster. They are in free variation.
 The approximant  has one allophone: .  occurs after .

There are two degrees of stress in Bontoc: primary and secondary. Primary stress is phonemic and secondary stress is predictable. Both types are right-oriented and occur on one of the last three syllables. Stress's effects include higher pitch, louder volume, and lengthening of the syllable nucleus, though these are all subject to certain rules pertaining to word prosody.

Example text

The Lord's Prayer

References

Further reading

External links
Talking Dictionary of Khinina-ang Bontok - online Bontoc Dictionary based on the speech community of Guina-ang, compiled by Lawrence A. Reid

Languages of Mountain Province
South–Central Cordilleran languages